X-Men: Madness in Murderworld is a video game for MS-DOS, Commodore 64, and Amiga systems, which was developed and published by Paragon Software in 1989. The following year, Paragon released a sequel, X-Men II: The Fall of the Mutants.

Plot
Professor X has been kidnapped by Magneto and Arcade, and it's up to the X-Men to rescue him.

Gameplay
The game is a side-scrolling arcade game featuring the X-Men. The original story takes place in Murderworld, a dangerous and deadly amusement park of terror. The X-Men, which include Colossus, Cyclops, Dazzler, Nightcrawler, Storm, and Wolverine, are pitted against their arch-enemies Arcade and Magneto. The game has more than 500 action and combat screens, as well as some puzzle-solving. A limited edition original comic book that leads up to the action in the game, was also included in the package.

Reception
The game received positive reception from critics. Compute! Magazine gave its playability, documentation, originality, and graphics four out of five stars. Abandonia rated the game 3.0 out of 4.

See also
Spider-Man and the X-Men in Arcade's Revenge

References

External links

1989 video games
Amiga games
Commodore 64 games
DOS games
Video games based on X-Men
Superhero video games
Video games developed in the United States
Video games set in amusement parks
Single-player video games